OdySea Aquarium in the Salt River Pima-Maricopa Indian Community in Scottsdale, Arizona, is a marine aquarium, and the largest aquarium in the Southwest United States. There are over 6,000 animals and 370 different species in over 65 exhibits. The aquarium offers an educational, interactive and entertaining experiences for guests of all ages.

Attractions 
This multi-level, state-of-the-art facility features more than 65 exhibits, 370 species, 6,000 animals, and several touch pools including the world’s only Russian Sturgeon touch exhibit, 2 Stingray touch exhibits, and a tide touch pool.  OdySea is also home to Voyager, where guests take their seats in a stadium-seating style theatre with 46 ft. viewing windows for the “world’s only rotating aquarium experience."  The restrooms are notable for have viewing windows into the shark habitat.  Additional interactive activities include SeaTREK® underwater walking, a charismatic “Penguin Interaction Program”, “Shark Behind the Scenes” tours, walk-about “Animal Ambassadors”, and Question & Answer sessions throughout the day with the Animal Care specialists.  OdySea Aquarium is accredited by the Association of Zoos & Aquariums and meets the gold standards of animal care. OdySea Aquarium offers an educational, interactive and entertaining experience for guests of all ages.

Gallery

References

External links

2016 establishments in Arizona
Aquaria in Arizona
Cultural infrastructure completed in 2016
Buildings and structures in Scottsdale, Arizona
Tourist attractions in Scottsdale, Arizona